Zinc finger protein 684 is a protein that in humans is encoded by the ZNF684 gene.

References

Further reading 

Human proteins